Food & Nutrition Research is an annual peer-reviewed open access medical journal covering nutrition and food science. It was established in 1996 as Näringsforskning, and was renamed the Scandinavian Journal of Nutrition in 2002. In 2006, the journal was renamed again, this time to the Scandinavian Journal of Food and Nutrition; it obtained its current name in 2008. It is published by the Swedish Nutrition Foundation in cooperation with Open Academia, and the editor-in-chief is Asim Duttaroy (University of Oslo). According to the Journal Citation Reports, the journal has a 2020 impact factor of 3.849(2020).

See also
 Open access in Sweden

References

External links

Nutrition and dietetics journals
Open access journals
Publications established in 1996
English-language journals